Gaël Nesterovich Bella Ondoua (born 4 November 1995), more known as Gaël Ondoua, is a Cameroonian professional footballer who plays as a midfielder for Hannover 96 and the Cameroon national team.

Career

Club
In April 2014, Ondoua moved from Lokomotiv Moscow to CSKA Moscow. He made his professional debut on 24 September 2014 for CSKA Moscow in a Russian Cup game against Khimik Dzerzhinsk. In January 2015, Ondoua went on trial with Sakhalin Yuzhno-Sakhalinsk of the Russian Football National League.

At the end of December 2017, it was reported that Ondoua had signed with Zorya Luhansk. On 12 March, however, he posted on his Instagram account that due circumstances beyond his contract he would not be a Zorya Luhansk player.

On 27 July 2018, Ondoua signed with the Russian Premier League club Anzhi Makhachkala.

On 2 July 2019, he signed with Swiss club Servette on a two-year contract plus an option year.

On 26 August 2021, Ondoua joined German club Hannover 96, signing a two-year contract.

International career
Ondoua debuted with the Cameroon national team in a 1–0 2022 World Cup qualification loss to Algeria on 25 March 2022. He was part of Cameroon's squad for the 2022 FIFA World Cup in Qatar where he made headlines after wearing the Russian flag on his boots amidst the Russian invasion of Ukraine.

Personal life
Ondoua grew up in Russia, where his father was a diplomat. He is fluent in Russian and holds Russian citizenship.

Career statistics

References

External links
 

1995 births
Living people
Cameroonian footballers
Cameroon international footballers
Footballers from Yaoundé
Association football midfielders
PFC CSKA Moscow players
Vejle Boldklub players
FC Anzhi Makhachkala players
FC Zorya Luhansk players
Servette FC players
Hannover 96 players
Danish 1st Division players
Russian Premier League players
Swiss Super League players
2. Bundesliga players
2022 FIFA World Cup players
Cameroonian expatriate footballers
Cameroonian expatriate sportspeople in Russia
Expatriate footballers in Russia
Cameroonian expatriate sportspeople in Denmark
Expatriate men's footballers in Denmark
Cameroonian expatriate sportspeople in Ukraine
Expatriate footballers in Ukraine
Cameroonian expatriate sportspeople in Switzerland
Expatriate footballers in Switzerland
Cameroonian expatriate sportspeople in Germany
Expatriate footballers in Germany